Cleveland is a masculine given name borne by:

 Cleveland Abbe (1838–1916), American meteorologist and advocate of time zones
 Cleveland Abbott (1894–1955), African-American football player, college football and basketball head coach and educator
 Cleveland Amory (1917–1998), American animal rights activist and author
 Cleveland Bailey (born 1918), Jamaican cricketer
 Cleveland M. Bailey (1886–1965), American politician
 Cleveland Colbert (1906–1962), African-American politician and activist
 Cleveland Eaton (1939–2020), American jazz double bassist, producer, arranger, composer and publisher
 Cleveland Gary (born 1966), American former National Football League running back
 Cleveland Watkiss (born 1959), British singer, actor and composer
 Cleveland Williams (1933–1999), American boxer

English-language masculine given names